Cesar Chavez High School is part of the Phoenix Union High School District.  The campus is located at 3921 West Baseline Road, south of Phoenix, in Laveen, Arizona. Cesar Chavez's enrollment is approximately 2,499 students, over 65 percent of whom are Hispanic. The school predominantly serves students from partner elementary districts Laveen and Roosevelt; however, students from across the district come to Cesar Chavez for large Advanced Placement and Honors program, Freshmen House, performing arts, and athletic programs.

History 
Cesar Chavez High School opened in 1999, and was named after late American labor leader and civil rights activist Cesar Chavez.

References

External links
 Cesar Chavez High School
 Phoenix Union High School District Website
 Arizona Department of Education School Report Card

Public high schools in Arizona
High schools in Phoenix, Arizona
1999 establishments in Arizona
Educational institutions established in 1999